Alamosa is a home rule municipality and the county seat of Alamosa County, Colorado, United States. The city population was 9,806 at the 2020 United States Census. The city is the commercial center of the San Luis Valley in south-central Colorado, and is the home of Adams State University.

History
Alamosa was established in May 1878 by the Denver and Rio Grande Railroad and quickly became an important rail center. Alamosa was the terminus of the D&RG until 1881, when the line was extended to Monte Vista. The railroad had an extensive construction, repair and shipping facility in Alamosa for many years and headquartered its remaining narrow gauge service here with trackage reaching many points throughout southwest Colorado and northern New Mexico. Alamosa is now a notable tourist town with many nearby attractions, including the Great Sand Dunes National Park and Preserve, Colorado Gators Reptile Park and the Rio Grande Scenic Railroad. The town hosts "Summer Fest on the Rio" which occurs the first weekend in June, the Early Iron car show over the Labor Day weekend, and "Weekends on the Rio" on various Sundays throughout the summer  The city takes its name from the Spanish adjective Alamosa, meaning "of cottonwood", for the cottonwood forests which grow along the Rio Grande and throughout town.

Geography
Alamosa is located at  (37.469, −105.874), at the junction of U.S. Routes 160 and 285. At the 2020 United States Census, the city had a total area of  including  of water.

Alamosa is located along the Rio Grande in the San Luis Valley, in the highest general agricultural land in the United States.

Alamosa is the gateway city to the Great Sand Dunes National Park and Preserve.

Climate
Alamosa features a cold desert climate (Köppen BWk) with long, cold winters and warm summers, and dry weather year-round. Annual precipitation is only , with the months of July through September being the wettest.

The altitude and dryness of the air cause day–night temperature differences to be severe year-round, averaging  throughout the year. In the 1981–2010 period, there was an average of 46 nights with minima at or below .

On July 10, 2020, Alamosa made weather history by measuring a record low temperature and a record high temperature in less than 12 hours.

Demographics

2020 census

As of the 2020 United States Census, there were 9,806 people, 3,828 households, and 1,935 families residing in the city.

2014
According to city-data.com from 2014 there were 9,531 people, 2,974 households, and 1,769 families residing in the city. The racial makeup of the city was 44.5% White, 2.6% Black or African American, 2.20% Native American, 1.7% Asian, 1.3% Pacific Islander, 0.3% from other races, and 0.9% from two or more races.  49.00% of the population were Hispanic or Latino of any race.

There were 2,974 households, out of which 32.0% had children under the age of 18 living with them, 40.5% were married couples living together, 14.6% had a female householder with no husband present, and 40.5% were non-families. 33.7% of all households were made up of individuals, and 11.0% had someone living alone who was 65 years of age or older.  The average household size was 2.36 and the average family size was 3.04.

In the city, the population was spread out, with 24.4% under the age of 18, 21.8% from 18 to 24, 24.8% from 25 to 44, 18.1% from 45 to 64, and 10.9% who were 65 years of age or older.  The median age was 28 years. For every 100 females, there were 91.4 males.  For every 100 females age 18 and over, there were 89.1 males.

The median income for a household in the city was $29,593, and the median income for a family was $33,017. Males had a median income of $27,100 versus $22,671 for females. The per capita income for the city was $15,405.  About 18.1% of families and 25.0% of the population were below the poverty line, including 30.4% of those under age 18 and 17.0% of those age 65 or over.

Government

Alamosa is a home rule municipality like many other Colorado towns. The City Council has six members, four elected from wards and two at large. The Council has authority to make, change, and repeal laws and ordinances. The city elects a mayor-at-large on a non-partisan ballot. The current mayor of Alamosa is Ty Coleman.

Education
Alamosa Public Schools are part of the Alamosa School District RE-11J, and include Alamosa Elementary School, Ortega Middle School, and Alamosa High School.  Robert Alejo is the Superintendent of Schools.

Adams State University, founded in 1921 as a teacher's college, offers both undergraduate and graduate programs. Graduate level programs emphasize teaching and education, art, history and business. Many courses are available  online. In 2015, the college reached an all-time high enrollment of 3,701 students. The University's location in Alamosa, with an elevation of about 7,800 ft above sea level, attracts many athletes (especially runners) to the school's athletic program. In 2014, ASU added a cycling program.

The schools in Alamosa were the subject to the educational segregation lawsuit, Maestas vs. George H. Shone.

Infrastructure

Transportation
Alamosa is on the Rio Grande River, which is crossed by two auto bridges, one pedestrian bridge and one rail bridge in town.  Auto traffic is served by U.S. Highway 160 running east and west and U.S. Highway 285 and State Highway 17 running north and south. Alamosa is served by the San Luis and Rio Grande Railroad and Bustang.  The local airport is San Luis Valley Regional Airport. Alamosa is part of Colorado's Bustang network. It is on the Alamosa-Pueblo Outrider line.

Facilities
Alamosa is the shopping center for the San Luis Valley and has a Walmart Supercenter, a Walgreens and two supermarkets, Safeway and City Market. There are a number of fast food restaurants, two medical clinics, and a regional hospital, San Luis Valley Regional Medical Center.

Adams State University is located in Alamosa. ASU is a four-year, state-supported university founded in 1921 and offering degrees in several fields including business and education.

Trinidad State College has a campus situated in Alamosa. They offer 2-year degrees in gunsmithing, aquaculture, cosmetology, welding and nursing, as well as traditional arts and sciences classes like English, physics and chemistry.

Notable people
 Billy Adams (1861–1954) — mayor of Alamosa, governor of Colorado from 1927 to 1933
 Garrey Carruthers (1939– • ) — governor of New Mexico from 1987 to 1991
 Camille Herron (1981– • ) — professional ultramarathon runner and World Record holder
 Michael Johnson (1944–2017) — singer, guitarist, recording artist
 Carlos F. Lucero (1940– • ) — judge, U.S. District Court of Appeals, 10th Circuit
 Alice Ivers Tubbs (1851–1930) — frontier gambler known as "Poker Alice"

See also

Colorado
Bibliography of Colorado
Index of Colorado-related articles
Outline of Colorado
List of counties in Colorado
List of municipalities in Colorado
List of places in Colorado
Mount Blanca

Footnotes

References

External links

City of Alamosa website
CDOT map of the City of Alamosa
Alamosa Convention and Visitors Bureau

 
Cities in Alamosa County, Colorado
Cities in Colorado
County seats in Colorado
Populated places established in 1878
1878 establishments in Colorado